The Osprey class was a Royal Navy class of screw-driven sloops built between 1874 and 1877. They were the first class of ship in the Royal Navy to use glass scuttles.

Design
They were of composite construction, with wooden hulls over an iron frame. Five ships of the class were built, which had been designed in 1874 by the Royal Navy's Chief Constructor, William Henry White. They were the first ships in the Royal Navy to have glass scuttles instead of solid plug scuttles.

Propulsion
The original design, as fitted to the first two ships of the class, was a single-expansion returning-rod steam engine, but the power was insufficient, and they failed to meet the contracted speed. Wild Swan and Penguin were re-engined after their first commission to match the better engines in the rest of the class. Because of this, top speeds ranged between 10 and 12 knots.

Armament
They were armed with two 7-inch (90cwt) muzzle-loading rifled guns on pivoting mounts, and four 64-pounder muzzle-loading rifled guns (two on pivoting mounts, and two broadside). Four machine guns and one light gun completed the weaponry.  Wild Swan and Pelican later had the muzzle-loading guns replaced with two 6-inch (81cwt) breech-loaders and six 5-inch (31cwt) breech-loaders.

Sail plan
All the ships of the class were provided with a barque rig, that is, square-rigged foremast and mainmast, and fore-and-aft sails only on the mizzen mast.

Crew
They had a complement of approximately 140 men.

Development
Identical in many respects, the Doterels lacked the graceful clipper bow of the Ospreys, although they benefited from more power.

Ships

Notes

References

Bibliography

External links

Sloop classes
 
 Osprey